Copeoglossum nigropunctatum, also known as the black-spotted skink, common coppery mabuya, or South American spotted skink, is a species of skink found in South America. It has shiny bronze or copper skin, with a dark longitudinal stripe along each flank that is often bordered by cream-colored lines.

It has been recorded as present in much of the northern South America and the Amazon River Basin, including Venezuela, the Guyanas (Guyana, French Guiana, Suriname), Colombia, Ecuador, Peru, Brazil, Bolivia, and Paraguay.

References

External links
Mabuya nigropunctata at the Encyclopedia of Life

nigropunctatum
Lizards of South America
Reptiles of Bolivia
Reptiles of Brazil
Reptiles of Colombia
Reptiles of French Guiana
Reptiles of Guyana
Reptiles of Paraguay
Reptiles of Peru
Reptiles of Suriname
Reptiles of Venezuela
Reptiles described in 1825
Taxa named by Johann Baptist von Spix